The following is a list of rulers of the county of Armagnac:

House of Armagnac

William Count of Fézensac and Armagnac  ?– 960 
Bernard the Suspicious, First count privative of Armagnac 960– ? 
Gerald I Trancaléon ? –1020 
Bernard I Tumapaler 1020–1061 
Gerald II 1061–1095 
Arnauld-Bernard II (associated 1072 for about ten years)
Bernard III 1095–1110 
Gerald III 1110–1160 
Bernard IV 1160–1188  
Gerald IV Trancaléon 1188–1215 
Gerald V 1215–1219 
Bernart Arnaut d'Armagnac 1217–1226, in opposition
Pierre-Gerald 1219–1241 
Bernard V  1241–1245 
Mascarose I (countess) 1245
Arnauld II count of Lectoure and Lomagne 1245–1249
Mascarose II 1249–1256
Eskivat de Chabanais, lord of Chabannais 1249–1256  
Gerald VI  1256–1285 
Bernard VI 1285–1319 
Jean I  1319–1373 
Jean II the Hunchbacked 1373–1384 
Jean III  1384–1391 
Bernard VII 1391–1418 
Jean IV 1418–1450 
Jean V 1450–1473 
Charles I 1473–1497

House of Alençon 
Charles II 1509–1525

House of Albret 
Henri I 1527–1555
Jeanne of Albret 1555–1572
Henry II (King of France as Henry IV 1572–1589)

House of Lorraine
Henry de Lorraine, the Young 1607–1666 
Louis de Lorraine 1666–1718, son of the above;
Charles de Lorraine 1718–1751, son of the above.

Notes

References
 Bulletin de la Section de géographie, Vol.15, Ed. Comité des travaux historiques et scientifiques, Imprimerie Nationale, 1900.

External links
 The Households of the Counts of Armagnac in the Late Middle Ages - abstract of a paper analyzing the household expenses of Count Bernard VII, from the Société Internationale des Médiévistes.